Ezra Ripley (1 May 1751 – 21 September 1841) was an American minister of Concord's First Parish Unitarian Church.

Biography
Ripley graduated from Harvard in 1776 where he taught and subsequently studied theology. In 1778 he was ordained to the ministry in Concord, Massachusetts, where he continued for 63 years, preaching his last sermon the day after his 90th birthday. Harvard gave him the degree of D.D. in 1818. Ripley was a leader in the temperance movement.

At the time Ripley settled in Concord the town was divided into two religious factions, but he quickly succeeded in binding them in a union that existed for nearly 50 years. During this period, Ripley was the only minister in town. He married the widow of his predecessor, the reverend William Emerson, Sr. William’s grandson, Ralph Waldo Emerson, later said of Ripley:

With a limited acquaintance with books, his knowledge was an external experience, an Indian wisdom. In him perished more personal and local anecdote of Concord and its vicinity than is possessed by any survivor, and in his constitutional leaning to their religion he was one of the rear-guard of the great camp and army of the Puritans.

Ripley took up residence in the Old Manse in Concord. In 1836, he gave land for the use of installing a monument to commemorate the battle of Concord, which had been fought on April 19, 1775. For 50 years after the American Revolution there was a controversy between Concord and Lexington for the honor of “making the first forcible resistance to British aggression.” Ripley wrote a pamphlet on that subject, entitled a History of the Fight at Concord, in which he argued that, though the British had fired first in the battle of Lexington early in the morning of April 19, 1775, the Americans fired first at the North Bridge in Concord later that morning (1827). Ripley was not present at either battle, and the consensus among historians (for example the late John Galvin, U.S. Army general and former Supreme Allied Commander of NATO forces) concluded that there is neither conclusive evidence nor agreement about which side fired first in either battle. 

Ripley also published several sermons and addresses, and a Half-Century Discourse (1828).

Notes

References

External links
 The sermons of Ezra Ripley are in the Harvard Divinity School Library at Harvard Divinity School in Cambridge, Massachusetts.
 Sermons from 1800-1837
 Sermons from 1800-1838

1751 births
1841 deaths
American clergy
People from Concord, Massachusetts
People from Woodstock, Connecticut
Ralph Waldo Emerson
Harvard University alumni